Michał Kudła (born 17 October 1991 or 1997) is a Polish canoeist. He competed in the men's C-2 1000 metres event at the 2016 Summer Olympics.

References

External links
 
 
 
 

1990s births
Living people
Polish male canoeists
Olympic canoeists of Poland
Canoeists at the 2016 Summer Olympics
Sportspeople from Poznań
European Games competitors for Poland
Canoeists at the 2015 European Games
Canoeists at the 2019 European Games